Laura Alejandra Martinel Acuña (born 20 December 1963) is a retired female judoka from Argentina. She claimed the silver medal in the Women's Middleweight (–66 kg) division at the 1991 Pan American Games in Havana, Cuba. Martinel represented her native South American country at the 1992 Summer Olympics in Barcelona, Spain, where she was defeated in the repechage round by France's Claire Lecat.

References

External links
 
 
 
 

1963 births
Living people
Argentine female judoka
Judoka at the 1992 Summer Olympics
Olympic judoka of Argentina
Pan American Games silver medalists for Argentina
Pan American Games medalists in judo
Sambokas at the 1983 Pan American Games
Judoka at the 1991 Pan American Games
Medalists at the 1991 Pan American Games